Seaboard Milling Company, also known as Seaboard Roller Mill and Broadway Roller Mills, is a historic roller mill located at Sanford, Lee County, North Carolina. It was built in 1915–1916, and is a three-story, brick building with a gable roof with stepped end parapets and traces of decorative exterior painting.  It has a one-story metal-sided frame wing erected in two phases about 1920, and a one-story cinder-block office wing from the early 1950s.

It was listed on the National Register of Historic Places in 2002.

References

Grinding mills in North Carolina
Grinding mills on the National Register of Historic Places in North Carolina
Industrial buildings completed in 1916
Buildings and structures in Lee County, North Carolina
National Register of Historic Places in Lee County, North Carolina